Thule Air Station (ADC ID: G-32) is a closed United States Air Force General Surveillance Radar station. It was closed in 1965.

History
Thule Air Station was constructed as a Ground-Control Intercept (GCI) radar site at the World War II Bluie West-6 weather station in 1950 by Northeast Air Command (NEAC), in conjunction with the larger Thule Air Base, 9 miles to the north . Its mission was to detect intrusion of unknown aircraft and relay that information to the interceptor squadron at Thule Air Base.  The 931st Aircraft Control and Warning Squadron was assigned on 1 July 1952 by NEAC, and the station was declared operationally  ready on 8 November 1952, the station (G-32) was equipped with AN/FPS-3, AN/FPS-4, AN/FPS-20A and AN/FPS-6 radars.

To broaden its range, two additional manned sites were established.

The main station was logistically supported by Thule Air Base, and personnel assigned to the Radar Station would transport to and from the base, weather permitting.  Duty at the station consisted of an "A" and a "B" shift of twelve hours each day, seven days a week.  Personnel at the remote sites lived under the snow in metal structures connected by unheated hallways of steel corrugated tubes. When they did go outside it was through hatches in the ceilings to access auxiliary structures and the radar antennas.  The locations of the stations, all north of the Arctic Circle, meant long periods without sunlight all day or with sunlight all day.  The remote sites were supported by C-47 Skytrains equipped with skis, which would land on the hard-packed snow near the stations, providing logistical support and personnel transportation to and from Thule AB.  Each remote site had a personnel complement of 20.

Although the Air Force provided as much in terms of recreation facilities at the remote sites as was possible, the fact was that in the 1950s, the duty there was extremely isolated and hard on the airmen stationed there. Det 1 and Det 2 were closed in April 1957 when Air Defense Command took over the stations and inactivated the "A" and "B" sites.

The radar site closed on 24 December 1965, and was replaced by the 12th Missile Warning Squadron, with radars designed to monitor ICBM launches rather than aircraft coming over from the Soviet Union.  The main station at Thule was torn down in 1985.  The remote sites were abandoned and left to the Arctic elements.

Air Force units and assignments 

Units:
 931st Aircraft Control and Warning Squadron, Activated 1 July 1952 at Thule AB, Greenland
 Assigned to Thule Air Station, 1 November 1952
 Discontinued, 24 December 1965

Assignments:
 64th Air Division (NEAC), 1 July 1952
 4734th Air Defense Group (ADC), 1 April 1957
 64th Air Division, 1 May 1958
 4683d Air Defense Wing, 1 July 1960
 4683d Air Base Group, 1 July 1965 – 24 December 1965

See also
 List of USAF Aerospace Defense Command General Surveillance Radar Stations
 The Thing from Another World (Film)

References

  A Handbook of Aerospace Defense Organization 1946 - 1980,  by Lloyd H. Cornett and Mildred W. Johnson, Office of History, Aerospace Defense Center, Peterson Air Force Base, Colorado
 Winkler, David F. (1997), Searching the skies: the legacy of the United States Cold War defense radar program. Prepared for United States Air Force Headquarters Air Combat Command.
 Information for Thule AS, Greenland

Radar stations of the United States Air Force
Aerospace Defense Command military installations
Stations of the United States Air Force
Military installations closed in 1965
Military installations established in 1951
1951 establishments in Greenland
1965 disestablishments in Greenland